Felice Darioli (born February 10, 1947) is an Italian cross-country skier.

Darioli was born in Bognanco. Together with Willy Bertin and Lino Zanon he finished fourth in the 1971, and second in the 1973 Trofeo Mezzalama, and as a non-commissioned officer in a team with Bertin and Fabrizio Pedranzini, he placed third in the military team category in the 1975 edition of the same competition, which was carried out as the first World Championship of Skimountaineering. He lives in Domodossola. He also won a Bronze medal in the relay event of the international CISM championships in Lebanon.

Selected cross-country skiing results 
 1971:
 2nd, Italian men's championships of cross-country skiing, relay
 3rd, Italian men's championships of cross-country skiing, 50 km
 1972:
 1st, Italian men's championships of cross-country skiing, relay, together with Willy Bertin, Serafino Guadagnini and Renzo Chiocchetti
 3rd, Italian men's championships of cross-country skiing, 30 km

External links 
 Darioli Felice 
 Felice Darioli, Coni

References

1947 births
Living people
Italian male ski mountaineers
Italian male cross-country skiers
Italian military patrol (sport) runners
Sportspeople from the Province of Verbano-Cusio-Ossola